River Ridge is an unincorporated community and census-designated place in Pasco County, Florida, United States. Its population was 4,702 as of the 2010 census.

Geography

It is east of New Port Richey, Florida and north east of Jay B. Starkey Wilderness Park. Located South of Florida State Road 52 inland from Hudson, it is within the Tampa–St. Petersburg–Clearwater Metropolitan Statistical Area (MSA) and the Southwest Florida Water Management District.

See also
 River Ridge High School (Florida)

References

Unincorporated communities in Pasco County, Florida
Unincorporated communities in Florida
Census-designated places in Pasco County, Florida
Census-designated places in Florida